"You Don't Know" is a song by American band Berlin, which was released in 1986 as the third single from their fourth studio album Count Three & Pray. It was written by John Crawford and produced by Andy Richards, Bob Ezrin and Berlin. It reached No. 39 in the UK and No. 16 in Belgium.

"You Don't Know" was recorded in London. Recalling the initial recording of Count Three & Pray, Nunn said in a 2014 interview for Pop Entertainment: "It was so bad with this guy in England that we trashed the whole thing. I think we kept one song, "You Don't Know," that he had done. We started all over with Bob Ezrin."

A music video was filmed to promote the single, which gained breakout rotation on MTV.

Critical reception
Upon release, Cash Box commented: "A cool, atmospheric treatment shows the musical growth of former synth-pop pioneers. The haunting melody and non-conforming arrangement form a bracing contrast to Terri Nunn's sultry, passionate vocal." Vici MacDonald of Smash Hits described the song as "really quite good" and added: "A screechy guitar and a wailsome woman echo distantly over a foreboding, rolling drumbeat and the whole thing's massive, mysterious and foggy".

Track listing
7" single
"You Don't Know (Edit)" - 3:18
"Trash" - 3:38

7" single (UK release)
"You Don't Know" - 3:18
"Hideaway" - 5:00

7" single (Japanese release)
"You Don't Know" - 4:27
"Trash" - 3:38

7" single (US promo)
"You Don't Know (Edit)" - 3:18
"You Don't Know (Edit)" - 3:18

7" single (Japanese promo)
"You Don't Know" - 4:27
"Trash" - 3:38

12" single (UK release)
"You Don't Know" - 4:26
"Hideaway" - 5:08
"Dancing in Berlin (Remix)" - 4:44

12" single (UK two vinyl gatefold release)
"You Don't Know" - 4:26
"Hideaway" - 5:08
"Dancing in Berlin (Remix)" - 4:44
"No More Words (Dance Remix)" - 5:44
"Will I Ever Understand You" - 4:40

12" single (European release)
"You Don't Know (Extended Remix)" - 5:31
"Trash" - 3:38
"You Don't Know (7" Version)" - 3:30

12" single (UK promo)
"You Don't Know" - 4:26
"Hideaway" - 5:08
"Dancing in Berlin (Remix)" - 4:44

12" single (US promo)
"You Don't Know (Edit)" - 3:16
"You Don't Know (LP Version)" - 4:26

Charts

Personnel
Berlin
 Terri Nunn - vocals
 John Crawford - bass, background vocals
 Rob Brill - drums, background vocals

Additional musicians
 Masakazu Yoshizawa - shakuhachi on "You Don't Know"
 Osamu Kitajima - koto and biwa on "You Don't Know"
 Andy Richards - keyboards and keyboard programming on "You Don't Know"

Production
 Andy Richards - producer on "You Don't Know"
 Bob Ezrin - producer on "You Don't Know", "Trash" and "Will I Ever Understand You"
 Terri Nunn - producer on "You Don't Know", "Trash" and "Hideaway"
 John Crawford - producer on "You Don't Know", "Trash" and "Hideaway"
 Rob Brill - producer on "You Don't Know", "Trash" and "Hideaway"
 Ted Hayton - recording of "You Don't Know"

Other
 Lara Rossignol - photography (US sleeve)

References

1986 songs
1986 singles
Mercury Records singles
Geffen Records singles
Berlin (band) songs
Song recordings produced by Bob Ezrin